Riz (also Romanized as Rīz) is a city in Riz District of Jam County, Bushehr province, Iran. At the 2006 census, its population was 1,802 in 415 households. The following census in 2011 counted 2,405 people in 641 households. The latest census in 2016 showed a population of 3,282 people in 944 households.

References 

Cities in Bushehr Province
Populated places in Jam County